The Mukkolakkal Bhagawathi Temple is a famous temple of the Hindu mother goddess Bhagawati.   One of the renowned Goddess Temples in Kerala, Sree Varaham Mukkolackal Bhagavathi Temple is situated at Sreevaraham, on the south-east of Sree Padmanabha Swamy Temple in Thiruvananthapuram. The temple is situated on the south of the famous Sreevaraham Lakshmi Varaha Temple. 
'Ooruttu Mahotsavam', the annual religious festival of the temple, is conducted in March - April every year.

Legend

The legend says that, when a few children were playing, one of them fell down hitting on a sedimentary rock. Soon after that, the rock started bleeding. Astrological observations confirmed the presence of divinity in the stone and the people around the area started worshipping the rock which eventually turned out to a famous temple in southern Kerala.

Deities and sub-deities
Mukkolakkal Bhagavathy Temple enshrines a Swayambhu (self originated) Panchaloha idol of Goddess Parvati – a manifestation of Goddess Shakti.

The main upadevathas on the premises are
 Lord Ganesh
 Nagaraja
 Brahmarakshassu
 Maadan Thampuran
 Yakshi Amma
 Navagraha

Important Months 
 Kanni - Navarathri aghosham is a famous festival, which attracts large number of devotees. On Vijayadasami day of the Navarathri utsavam, Vidyarambham is conducted.
 Vrishchikam - The Vrishchicka Mandala mahotsavam (festival) is celebrated during the entire period of mandalam season.
 Meenam - The annual festival of the temple comes in Meenam. It begins with inviting and placing  Bhagawathy in pacha panthal(Hut made of green palm leaves). Ooroottu is the major festival celebrated at Mukkolakkal Bhagavathy Temple annually. Also known as Ooroottu Maholtsavam, the festival starts on the Thiruonam nakshatra in the Malayalam month of Meenam. Parakkezhunnallippu (Ezhunallippu or Royal Procession of the deity atop an elephant), Pongala, Kuthiyottam, traditional music and dance programs, and colourful fireworks held at the temple premises are major attractions of the Mukkolackal Temple festival.
 Medam -  Vishu festival.
 Karkitakam - Aadi chovva festival.

Temple timings 
Sreevaraham Mukkolakkal Bhagavathy Temple opens daily at 4:45 AM for Palliyunarthal ceremony and closes at 8:00 PM after Athazha Pooja and Deeparadhana. The worship timings are from 4:45 AM to 10:35 AM and 5:00 PM to 8:00 PM. On Tuesdays and Fridays, the temple closes at 8:30 PM after special Pooja offerings.

Distance to Mukkolakkal Temple 
From
 Thiruvananthapuram Airport - 5 km.
 Thiruvananthapuram Central Railway Station - 3 km.
 Thiruvananthapuram K.S.R.T.C. central Bus Stand - 3 km.
 Thiruvananthapuram City Bus Stand - 2 km.

See also 
 Temples of Kerala

References

Bhagavathi temples in Kerala
Hindu pilgrimage sites in India
Hindu temples in Thiruvananthapuram district